The discography of MNL48 consists of seven singles. The A-side (main) song is performed by a special member selection called the  senbatsu ("selection"). Each team are given one song per single, which they have to audition to get it. The songs are covers of the Japanese songs originally recorded by AKB48, the sister group of MNL48 with the Japanese lyrics translated into Filipino.

Singles

As Lead Artists

Sub-unit

As Featured Artist

Senbatsu history 

Team:
 Team MII
 Team NIV
 Team L
 Team Unknown
 Kenkyuusei
 Graduated

Charted Songs

A-side Single

Other charted songs

MYX Live! Performances

Baby Blue (MNL48's Sub-unit)

Music Videos

As Lead Artist

BABY BLUE

As Featured Artist

Filmography

Film

Television 

Notes

Web

Concerts

References 

Discography
Pop music group discographies